John Lewis (died ) was a Canadian-born British electronic music and experimental composer and musician who worked on multiple projects during the 1970s and 1980s. Born in Edmonton, Canada, he received classical music education at the University of Alberta in the mid-1960s and relocated to England, where he composed scores for Ballet Rambert during the 1970s.

Around 1970 Lewis got acquainted with Brian Hodgson, who worked at the BBC Radiophonic Workshop at the time. In 1972 Hodgson left the BBC to set up Electrophon studios with Lewis. Under the name "Wavemaker", they released albums of melodic synthesiser music titled Where Are We Captain?... (1975) and New Atlantis (1977). In 1977, Hodgson returned to the Radiophonic Workshop and left the Electrophon studio in Lewis' hands.

Lewis worked with British new wave band M on their 1979 hit song "Pop Muzik". 

As Hodgson, and the entire Workshop, was heavily involved in creating Doctor Who sound effects and music, he suggested outsourcing some of the work to Lewis, who began recording the original incidental music for the serial The Mark of the Rani, broadcast in 1985. However, Lewis was already suffering from AIDS in an advanced stage, and managed to complete only the first episode of the score, when the fell too ill to complete the score. He died soon afterwards, and the score was finished by Jonathan Gibbs. Lewis' score for the first episode was included on the DVD release.

References

External links
 John Lewis discography on Discogs 
 Records produced at Electrophon Studios
 Hodgson and Lewis at Electrophon Studios in 1977.
 Hodgson and Lewis from the New Atlantis album cover.

1980s deaths
AIDS-related deaths in England
English electronic musicians
English experimental musicians
Musicians from Edmonton
Year of birth missing
Year of death missing